Nyam-Osoryn Naranbold (born 22 February 1992) is a Mongolian footballer who plays as a forward for Mongolian Premier League club Khovd and the Mongolian national team. With eight international goals, he is tied for first place on Mongolia’s all-time scorers list.

Club career
Naranbold began playing for Khoromkhon of the Mongolian Premier League in 2008. He made appearances in the club's two matches during the qualifying rounds of the 2016 AFC Cup, a 0–2 defeat to K-Electric F.C. of Pakistan and a 0–0 draw with Druk United of Bhutan. Khoromkhon failed to progress to the next round. With Khoromkhon, he won the league championship in 2014 and was runner-up in 2008 and 2012. For the 2015 season he was the league's top goal scorer with 23 goals.

Naranbold won the award again two seasons later with 17 goals after transferring to Athletic 220 FC prior to the 2017 Mongolian Premier League season. He scored both of the team’s goals in the final of the 2018 Mongolia Cup as Athletic 220 defeated Ulaanbaatar City FC 2–0 to win the title. He went on to help the club win back-to-back league championships in 2020 and 2021. Following the 2020 season he received the award for Best Goal and Best Male Player. Naranbold went on to score the club's only goal in the 2021 AFC Cup, coming in a 1–5 loss to Hong Kong's Lee Man FC.

In January 2022 Naranbold left Athletic 220 and became a free agent. On 3 March of that year he joined newly-promoted Tuv Buganuud. He finished the 2021–22 season with fourteen goals, tying him with Deren FC's Pavel Zakharov for second in the league. After a single season, Naranbold left the club and signed for Khovd FC.

International career
Naranbold made his senior international debut on 23 July 2014 in a 0–2 loss to Guam in the first round of the 2015 EAFF East Asian Cup. He scored his first senior international goal on 4 July 2016 in an 8–0 victory over the Northern Mariana Islands. The win set Mongolia's record for their largest margin of victory. He went on to score both of Mongolia's goals in a 2–0 victory over Sri Lanka during the 2016 AFC Solidarity Cup, the inaugural edition of the tournament.

International goals
Scores and results list Mongolia's goal tally first.

International career statistics

Honours
Khoromkhon
MFF Cup: 2012
Mongolian Premier League: 2014

Athletic 220
MFF Cup: 2018
Mongolian Premier League: 2020, 2021

References

External links

MFF profile

1992 births
Living people
Mongolian footballers
Association football forwards
Mongolia international footballers
Mongolian National Premier League players
Khoromkhon players
Athletic 220 players
Tuv Buganuud FC players